Manua is a Gram panchayat in hajipur,  vaishali district, bihar.

Geography
This panchayat is located at

Panchayat office
Rajiv Gandhi Seva bhawan Shahzadpur ( राजीव गांधी सेवा भवन Shahzadpur )

Nearest City/Town
Hajipur (Distance between 7 and 10 km)

Nearest major road highway or river
SH 74 (State highway 74)

compass

Villages in panchayat
There are  villages in this panchayat

References

Gram panchayats in Bihar
Villages in Vaishali district
Vaishali district
Hajipur